Jason Kehl is a professional American rock climber known for his highball bouldering ascents, inspired artistic endeavors, and for his work shaping holds. In 2006, he was awarded the prestigious Everest Award for climbing, and is the first person to ever boulder a 5.14d grade route; The Fly (climb), Rumney, NH.

Some of his other notable ascents are as follows:

[FA: First Ascent;     FBA: First Boulder Ascent]

 FA  – Evilution (V12) Buttermilks, CA, 12/02
 FBA – After Midnight (V11) Yosemite, CA, 04/03
 FA  – The New Zero (V13) Holy Boulders, South Illinois, 03/04
 FBA – Straight out of Squampton (5.13+) Squamish, British Columbia, 07/05
 FA  – Kumite (V10) Mizugaki, Japan, 06/06

Jason Kehl is widely recognized within the climbing community for his bohemian lifestyle and eclectic self-expression. For over a decade, Kehl has been living out of his van in order to facilitate climbing and travel. His art, diet, and lifestyle are heavily influenced by Eastern culture and thought, and for years, Kehl cut his hair in the Wu D'an kung fu style with an added twist of dreadlocks. These dreads were cut and burned in the latter part of 2010 in India where he was filming "The Zanskar Odyssey: High Alpine Bouldering in the Hidden Himalayas".

On Cryptochild.com, Kehl's website, he writes, "Climbing always interested me because it is a great way to express yourself using your body, sometimes aggressive like a brutal fight and sometimes slow and seductive like a ritualistic  dance. In that way I see climbing as a good artistic outlet." In 2008, Kehl underwent ACL replacement surgery and was sidelined for the better half of a year. During this time, Kehl focused more heavily on his website, blog, and other artistic pursuits. Kehl is interested in graphic design, special effects, videography, animation, and collecting doll heads. His most passionate artistic interest is certainly hold shaping, however, as Kehl has been shaping holds almost as long as he has been a professional climber. Boasting over 100 designs, he has shaped holds for Cryptochild as well as for five other companies: Pusher, Etch, So iLL, Revolution, and Ritual in Spain. 
Kehl is sponsored by Blurr, LaSportiva, Revolution, and Native Eyewear. He writes an ongoing blog for Deadpointmag.com.

References

External links
 www.cryptochild.com
 www.deadpointmag.com

American rock climbers
Living people
1976 births